Conach O'Shiel (also recorded as Conat O'Siaghal) was an Irish bishop in  the sixteenth century:  he was appointed by Henry VIII in 1544 and died 1551.

References

Anglican bishops of Elphin
1551 deaths